Mayevka is a rural locality (a village) in Churayevsky Selsoviet, Mishkinsky District, Bashkortostan, Russia. The population was 49 as of 2010. There is 1 street.

Geography 
Mayevka is located 46 km northwest of Mishkino (the district's administrative centre) by road. Novokilmetovo is the nearest rural locality.

References 

Rural localities in Mishkinsky District